Sodi may refer to:

People
 Sodi family, Mexican political family
 Demetrio Sodi Guergué (1866–1934), Mexican journalist, writer, jurist and politician
 Bosco Sodi (born 1970), Mexican artist
 Camila Sodi (born 1986), Mexican singer, actress and model

Other uses
 Sodi (Bible), a minor Old Testament figure
 Tara Sodi, a Holby City character
 I Sodi, an Italian restaurant in New York City